James Walker (born 29 March 1932) is a Northern Irish former professional footballer who played as a forward.

Career
Born in Belfast, Walker played for Ledley Hall, Glentoran, Linfield, Doncaster Rovers, Portadown and Crusaders. He also earned one cap for the Northern Ireland national team.

References

1932 births
Living people
Association footballers from Northern Ireland
Northern Ireland international footballers
Glentoran F.C. players
Linfield F.C. players
Doncaster Rovers F.C. players
Portadown F.C. players
NIFL Premiership players
English Football League players
Association football forwards
Expatriate association footballers from Northern Ireland
Expatriate footballers in England
Crusaders F.C. players